Ladder streets are narrow streets in Hong Kong comprising steps. Most are found between Central and Sheung Wan and Mid-Levels on Hong Kong Island, from Queen's Road Central, through Hollywood Road and a few other cross streets, to Caine Road at the Mid-Levels. Other ladder streets exist outside of the immediate Mid-Levels area, such as Sands Street in Kennedy Town.

Note that there is indeed a street named Ladder Street, composed entirely of stone steps, in Sheung Wan.

While some ladder streets are made only of traditional steps, some at a moderate incline have portions that could be traversed with a rickshaw or cart. These portions had raised stones perpendicular to the street at regular intervals acting like a ratchet so that carts and rickshaws could be easily stopped and parked. This kind of paving can be found on Pottinger Street.

The Duddell Street steps were declared a monument by the Antiquities and Monuments Office.

History 

Shortly after their arrival in Hong Kong, the British built administrative buildings on the northern shore of the island, in the area which came to be called Victoria and later called Central. The water met the island at what is now Queen's Road. There was no flat land, so during the brief tenure of Sir Henry Pottinger, the first governor of the colony, from 1841 to 1844, streets of steps were planned. The first recorded ladder street was built between Queen's Road and Gough Street in 1845. Remaining ladder streets steps are some of the very oldest structures in the territory.

The streets were originally made with the local pink granite. Most have been replaced with concrete.

Ladder streets

See also
Central–Mid-Levels escalator

References

External links

Travel in the Far East from Time Magazine
Hong Kong Street Markets
 
 
 
 

Central, Hong Kong
Sheung Wan
 
Types of streets